Matthew Dunstone, nicknamed "the Sheriff" (born June 25, 1995) is a Canadian curler from Kamloops, British Columbia.

Career
Dunstone won the Canadian Junior Curling Championships in 2013. He represented Canada at the 2013 World Junior Curling Championships, where he won the bronze medal. He was unable to defend his championship at the 2014 Canadian Juniors after losing in the finals of the Manitoba Canola Juniors to Braden Calvert. The next time he would represent Manitoba was in 2016, after winning the 2016 Manitoba Canola Juniors. This earned the Dunstone rink a spot in the 2016 Canadian Juniors where he won his second title after defeating Northern Ontario 11-4 in the final, and represented Canada at the 2016 World Junior Curling Championships, winning a bronze medal.

Dunstone joined the Saskatchewan-based Steve Laycock rink for the 2017-18 curling season, initially as second, but later in the season began throwing fourth stones, while Laycock skipped and threw third. Dunstone won his first provincial men's championship in 2018 with Team Laycock. The team represented Saskatchewan at the 2018 Tim Hortons Brier, where they finished with a 6-5 record.

Team Laycock broke up in 2018, and Dunstone formed a new Saskatchewan-based team, with him as skip, Braeden Moskowy at third , Catlin Schneider at second and Dustin Kidby at lead. The team was invited to represent Canada at the third leg of the 2018-19 Curling World Cup. The team won the event, defeating Team Sweden's Niklas Edin rink in the final.

In their first event of the 2019-20 season, Team Dunstone finished runner-up at the Stu Sells Oakville Tankard to John Epping. Dunstone also won his first career Grand Slam at the 2019 Masters where he defeated Brad Gushue in the final. The team failed to replicate the success as they were not able to qualify at the Tour Challenge, National, Canadian Open, and finishing winless at the 2019 Canada Cup. The team was able to win the 2020 SaskTel Tankard, after falling into the C Event, Team Dunstone won four straight games including defeating Kirk Muyres in the final to win the provincial championship. At the 2020 Tim Hortons Brier, they finished the round robin and championship pool with a 8–3 record which qualified them for the 1 vs. 2 game against Alberta's Brendan Bottcher. They lost the game 9–4 and then lost the semifinal to Newfoundland and Labrador's Gushue, settling for a bronze medal. It would be the team's last event of the season as both the Players' Championship and the Champions Cup Grand Slam events were cancelled due to the COVID-19 pandemic. After the season, Team Dunstone added Kirk Muyres to their team, replacing Catlin Schneider at second.

Due to the COVID-19 pandemic in Saskatchewan, the 2021 provincial championship was cancelled. As the reigning provincial champions, Team Dunstone was invited to represent Saskatchewan at the 2021 Tim Hortons Brier, which they accepted. At the Brier, Dunstone led his team to a 9–3 record, qualifying for the playoffs as the second seed. Facing Brendan Bottcher in the semifinal, they lost 6–5 after Bottcher made a runback to score two in the tenth end. Team Dunstone would have to settle for the bronze medal for a second straight year.

Personal life
Dunstone was a real estate student at the University of British Columbia, and currently works as a mortgage broker for Integra Mortgage. He is in a relationship with fellow curler Erin Pincott. Born and raised in Winnipeg, Manitoba, Dunstone officially moved to Kamloops, British Columbia to be with partner Pincott in 2018.

Grand Slam record

References

External links

1995 births
Living people
Curlers from Winnipeg
Canadian male curlers
Sportspeople from Kamloops
Canada Cup (curling) participants
University of British Columbia alumni